Popatlal Mulshankerbhai Joshi (1917-1999) was an Indian politician. He was elected to the Lok Sabha, the lower house of the Parliament of India from Banaskantha, Gujarat.

References

External links
Official biographical sketch in Parliament of India website

Indian National Congress politicians
Lok Sabha members from Gujarat
India MPs 1971–1977
1917 births
1999 deaths